I'm with Stupid is the second studio album by the American singer-songwriter Aimee Mann, released in 1995.

Commercial performance
As of February 2001, the album has sold 123,000 copies in United States.

Track listing
All tracks by Aimee Mann, except where noted.
"Long Shot" – 3:13
"Choice in the Matter" (Jon Brion, Mann) – 3:13
"Sugarcoated" (Butler, Mann) – 3:39
"You Could Make a Killing" – 3:21
"Superball" – 3:05
"Amateur" (Brion, Mann) – 4:51
"All Over Now" – 3:37
"Par for the Course" – 6:01
"You're with Stupid Now" – 3:27
"That's Just What You Are" (Brion, Mann) – 4:22
"Frankenstein" (Brion, Mann) – 4:25
"Ray" – 4:47
"It's Not Safe" – 5:02
[silence – 0:52]
untitled hidden track – 1:20

Personnel
 Aimee Mann – vocals (1-13), bass (1,3,4,5,8,10,12), guitar (1,2,5,8,13), backing vocals (2,3,10), acoustic guitar (4,9,10,12), electric guitar (4,7,10), handclaps (5), drums (8), keyboards (8), percussion (8,9)
 Jon Brion – guitar (1,6,13), percussion (1,2,7,13), backing vocals (1,2,3,7,9,13), drums (3,4,11,12), keyboards (3,6,11,13), lead guitar (4), bass harmonica (5), handclaps (5), bass (6,7,11,13), acoustic guitar (7,11), electric guitar (7,9), acoustic bass (9), cello (9), distorted nylon guitar (11), tack piano (12), harmonium (12)
 Bernard Butler – guitar (3), keyboards (3), electric guitar (7)
 Mike Denneen – keyboards (5,10)
 Chris Difford – backing vocals (2,10,11)
 Brad Hallan – bass (2)
 Juliana Hatfield – backing vocals (4,6)
 Neil Innes – backing vocals (13)
 Stacy Jones – drums (1,7)
 Michael Lockwood – guitar (1)
 Jon Lupfer – handclaps (5)
 Michael Penn – guitar (13)
 John Sands – drums (1,2,5,13), guitar (2)
 Clayton Scoble – backing vocals (1,12,13), electric guitar (10), guitar (13)
 Glenn Tilbrook – backing vocals (2,10,11,13), electric guitar (10)
 Martyn Watson – drum loop stuff (10)
Technical
 Joseph Jack Puig – mixing
 Mike Denneen – mixing
 Rob Jaczko – mixing
 Jonathan Wyner – mastering

Guests
Glenn Tilbrook and Chris Difford from the band Squeeze appear as background vocalists and musicians on "That's Just What You Are", "Frankenstein", and "It's Not Safe", and they allowed Mann to use a riff from their song "Up the Junction" on "Long Shot".  Juliana Hatfield provides backing vocals on "You Could Make a Killing" and "Amateur."  Neil Innes, from The Bonzo Dog Doo Dah Band, Monty Python and The Rutles, provides backing vocals on "It's Not Safe".

Uses in media
Prior to the album's release, "That's Just What You Are" appeared on the soundtrack of Fox Network television series Melrose Place in 1994, while "Amateur" appeared on the Sliding Doors soundtrack in 1998 and NBC television series Ed in 2004. "You Could Make a Killing" appeared on The Curve soundtrack in 1998 and the Cruel Intentions soundtrack in 1999.

Charts

Weekly charts

Singles

References

Aimee Mann albums
1995 albums
Albums produced by Jon Brion
Geffen Records albums